Lalgaye  is a department or commune of Koulpélogo Province in eastern Burkina Faso. Its capital lies at the town of Lalgaye. According to the 1996 census the department has a total population of 18,691.

Towns and villages

 Lalgaye (4 172 inhabitants) (capital)
 Dibli (982 inhabitants) 
 Gouli (632 inhabitants) 
 Guini (651 inhabitants) 
 Kieblin (312 inhabitants) 
 Kimzim (648 inhabitants) 
 Lalgaye (2 069 inhabitants) 
 Lalgaye Yarce (437 inhabitants) 
 Nassiega (1 125 inhabitants) 
 Pihitenga (692 inhabitants) 
 Paore (342 inhabitants) 
 Pissiongo (260 inhabitants) 
 Sablogo (970 inhabitants) 
 Tensobentenga (2 292 inhabitants) 
 Tiguetin (990 inhabitants) 
 Yalgo (2 117 inhabitants)

References

Departments of Burkina Faso
Koulpélogo Province